Walking on the Milky Way can refer to:

 Walking on the Milky Way (album), album by Franciscus Henri
Walking on the Milky Way (song), song by Orchestral Manoeuvres in the Dark (OMD)